Functional logic programming is the combination, in a single programming language, of the paradigms of functional programming and logic programming. This style of programming is embodied by various programming languages, including Curry and Mercury.

A journal devoted to the integration of functional and logic programming was published by MIT Press and the European Association for Programming Languages and Systems between 1995 and 2008.

References

External links
 Functional logic programming at U. Kiel
 "func" library for SWI-Prolog

Functional programming
Logic programming
Programming paradigms